Although primarily known as a filmmaker, Werner Herzog has also written multiple books and other works.

Bibliography

Books

Writer
 Fitzcarraldo: The Original Story (Fjord Pr, January 1983)
 Of Walking in Ice (Free Association, New York, 2007)
 Conquest of the Useless: Reflections from the Making of Fitzcarraldo (Eroberung des Nutzlosen) (German: 2004; English: Ecco, 2009)
 Werner Herzog: A Guide for the Perplexed, Conversations with Paul Cronin (London: Faber and Faber Ltd., 2014)
 The Twilight World (translated by Michael Hofmann; Penguin Press, New York, 2022)

Co-writer
 Lena Herzog. Pilgrims: Becoming the Path Itself (Periplus Publishing London Ltd., 2002)

Screenplays

Writer
 Drehbücher II: Aguirre, der Zorn Gottes: Jeder für sich und Gott gegen alle, Land des Schweigens und der Dunkelheit (Hanser 1977)
 Drehbücher I: Lebenszeichen, Auch Zwerge haben klein angefangen, Fata Morgana (Hanser 1977)
 Drehbücher III: Stroszek, Nosferatu (Hanser 1979)
 Screenplays: Aguirre, The Wrath of God, Every Man For Himself and God Against All & Land of Silence and Darkness (translated by Alan Greenberg & Martje Herzog; Tanam, New York, 1981)
 Fitzcarraldo, Nosferatu, Stroszek (Mazarine 1982)
 Wo Die Grünen Ameisen Träumen (Hanser 1984)
 Nosferatu (Ulbulibri, 1984)
 Cobra Verde (Jade-Flammarion 2001)

Co-writer
 With Alan Greenberg and Herbert Achternbusch. Heart of Glass. 1976

References

Bibliography